Anxietas is a genus of extremely small deep water sea snails, marine gastropod mollusks in the family Seguenziidae.

Species
Species within the genus Anxietas include:
Anxietas exigua Marshall, 1991
Anxietas inspirata Marshall, 1991
Anxietas perplexa Iredale, 1917

References

External links
 To ITIS
 To World Register of Marine Species

 
Seguenziidae
Gastropod genera